Henry Gilpin is the name of:

 Harry Gilpin (1876–1950), British politician and company director
 Henry D. Gilpin (1801–1860), American Attorney General